Tuizelo is a Portuguese freguesia (parish) of the municipality of Vinhais, Bragança district, with 34,80 km² of area and 387 inhabitants (2011); it has  a population density of only 11.1 inhabitants per square kilometer.

Located in the north of the municipality, about 12 kilometers from Vinhais, the access is made by EN 316 road. The freguesia houses the villages of Tuizelo, Peleias, Salgueiros, Quadra, Nuzedo de Cima, Cabeça de Igreja, and Revelhe.

History 
The area where lies Tuizelo was inhabited before the twelfth century AD, according  to the remains of ancient peoples in the region (such as castrejos). Tuizelo derives from the Germanic word "Teodicellus" which is a historical name of a Visigoth king of the Peninsula.

In popular culture 
The High Mountains of Portugal, book by Yann Martel is partially set in Tuizelo.

Gallery

References

Freguesias of Vinhais